The 2013–14 ECHL season was the 26th season of the ECHL.  The regular season schedule ran from October 18, 2013, to April 13, 2014, followed by the Kelly Cup playoffs. The league began the season with 22 teams scheduled to play 72 regular season games each, but one team folded during the season, which required the league to reschedule games in order to provide the remaining teams with full schedules.

League business

Team changes 
 The Trenton Titans ceased operations at the end of the 2012–13 season.
 The San Francisco Bulls ceased operations on January 27, 2014 after playing only 40 games of the season.

New affiliations and changes

Annual Board of Governors meeting
The ECHL Board of Governors was held the first week of July 2013 in Las Vegas, Nevada where the Board of Governors re-elected Gwinnett Gladiators president Steve Chapman as chairman for an eighth term and awarded the 2015 All-star game to the Orlando Solar Bears.

Regular season

Conference standings 
x - clinched playoff spot, y - clinched division title, z - clinched best conference record, e - eliminated from playoff contention

x - clinched playoff spot, y - clinched division title, b - clinched Brabham Cup, best record in the conference and first round bye, e - eliminated from playoff contention, w - ceased operations

Divisional standings 
Eastern Conference

x - clinched playoff spot, y - clinched division title, e - eliminated from playoff contention

Western Conference

x - clinched playoff spot, y - clinched division title, b - clinched Brabham Cup, best record in the conference and first round bye, e - eliminated from playoff contention, w - ceased operations

Postseason

References

See also 
2013 in sports
2014 in sports

 
2013-14
3
3